New Zealand at the 1956 Summer Olympics was represented by a team of 53 competitors and 12 officials. Selection of the team for the Games in Melbourne, Australia, was the responsibility of the New Zealand Olympic and British Empire Games Association. New Zealand's flagbearer at the opening ceremony was Ritchie Johnston.  The New Zealand team finished 16th on the medal table, winning a total of two medals, both of which were gold.

Medal tables

Athletics

Track and road

Field

Boxing

Cycling

Track
Men's 1000 m time trial

Men's sprint

Men's tandem

Men's team pursuit

Alan Larkins was a reserve for the team pursuit but did not compete.

Field hockey

Men's tournament
The men's field hockey team from New Zealand made its Olympic debut in Melbourne. Before 1956, the only international hockey team apart from Australia that New Zealand had played against was India.

Team roster

Group C

5th–8th Classification round

Rowing

In 1956, New Zealand entered boats in three of the seven events. The competition was for men only; women would first row at the 1976 Summer Olympics. Don Rowlands travelled to the Summer Olympics as a reserve but did not compete.

Sailing

Swimming

Weightlifting

Wrestling

Officials
Chef de mission – Lloyd Woods

References

External links 
New Zealand Olympic Committee – Games Profile: 1956 Melbourne
sports-reference
Picture of athletes at the Olympic Village

Nations at the 1956 Summer Olympics
1956
Summer Olympics